Bora is an indigenous language of South America spoken in the western region of Amazon rainforest. Bora is a tonal language which, other than the Ticuna language, is a unique trait in the region.

The majority of its speakers reside in Peru and Colombia. Around 2,328 Bora speakers live in the areas of the northeast Yaguasyacu, Putumayo and Ampiyacu rivers of Peru. There are about 500 speakers of Bora also in Colombia in the Putumayo Department. Peruvian speakers have a 10 to 30% literacy rate and a 25 to 50% literacy rate in their second language of Spanish. 

Early linguistic investigators thought that Bora was related to the Huitoto (Witoto) language, but there is very little similarity between the two. The confusion was most likely due to the frequent intermarriage between the tribes and the Ocaina dialect of Witotoan which has many Bora words.

Dialects 
Miraña, a dialect of Bora, is spoken along the Caquetá-Japurá river which flows from Colombia to Brazil, and a few villages are there.

Bora proper has 94% mutual comprehensibility with the Miraña dialect.

Another dialect of Bora, Murnane, which has about a 50% comprehensibility with Bora and Miraña, is spoken along tributaries of the Caquetá River in central Colombia.

Loukotka (1968) lists these dialects of Bora:
Bora (Boro) - on the Cahuinari River and in a colony in the village of Méria on the Igara Paraná River
Imihitä (Emejeite) - spoken on the Jacaré River
Fa:ai - spoken in the Sierra Futahy in the same region (poorly attested, only a few words)

Grammar 
Bora contains 350 classifiers, the most discovered of any languages thus far.

Orthography 
The written form of Bora was developed by Wycliffe Bible Translators Wesley and Eva Thiesen with the help of the natives of the village of Brillo Nuevo on the Yaguasyacu river. Wesley and Eva Thiesen's daughter Ruth is also the first recorded non-native to learn the language. First, Bora to Spanish school books was developed. Then the New Testament Bible was translated. Finally, a comprehensive dictionary and grammar book was developed to document and preserve the language's grammar rules. This has since facilitated more textbooks so that speakers can be taught to read and write in their language, rescuing it from extinction due to the prevalence of Spanish and Portuguese in the regions where it is spoken.

Phonology 

 All vowels have long forms. Bora demonstrates contrastive vowel length.

 /h/ can have an allophone of [x].
 /j/ is also heard as [ɾʲ].

References

External links

 Native Languages: Bora Aces. Feb. 2015
 A Grammar of Bora
 Diccionario Bora-Castellano
 Datos Etno-Lingüísticos 1
 Textos folklóricos de los bora
 Vocabulario ocaina
 Bora DoReCo corpus compiled by Frank Seifart. Audio recordings of narrative texts with transcriptions time-aligned at the phone level, translations, and time-aligned morphological annotations.

Boran languages
Languages of Peru
Languages of Colombia